Perungamani  is a village in the Srirangam taluk of Tiruchirappalli district in Tamil Nadu, India.

Demographics 

As per the 2001 census, Perungamani had a population of 3,618 with 1,822 males and 1,796 females. The sex ratio was 986 and the literacy rate, 78.54.

References 

 

Villages in Tiruchirappalli district